The 2020 Hankook 24 Hours of Portimão was the fourth running of the 24 Hours of Portimão automobile race. It was also the second round of both the 2020 24H GT Series and the 2020 24H TCE Series, the second round of the Championship of the Continents Series and first of the Europe Series, being held from 13 to 14 June at the Algarve International Circuit. The race was won by Jürgen Häring, Michael Joos, Taki Konstantinou, Tim Müller, and Marco Seefried, driving for Herberth Motorsport.

Schedule

Entry list
A total of fifteen cars were entered for the event; 9 GT and 6 TCE cars.

Results

Practice
Fastest in class in bold.

Qualifying

GT
Class pole position in bold.

TCE
Class pole position in bold.

Night Practice
Class pole position in bold.

Race
Class winner in bold.

References

External links

24 Hours of Portimao
24 Hours of Portimao
2020 in 24H Series